Grove Hill is a town in Clarke County, Alabama, United States. At the 2020 census, the population was 1,818. It is the county seat of Clarke County and home of the Clarke County Museum.

History
The area that is now Grove Hill was originally inhabited by Creek and Choctaw Indians. The county seat of Clarke County was established at what later became Grove Hill in 1832 as the spot was most central to the rest of the county. Known variously as Smithville, then Macon, the name Grove Hill was selected around 1850 for the large grove of oak trees on the plateau. The town was officially incorporated and chartered in 1929. In 1853, a yellow fever epidemic struck the town, killing many residents, almost wiping out the town.

The Grove Hill area has numerous sites on the National Register of Historic Places including the Alston-Cobb House, Bush House, John A. Coate House, Cobb House, Dickinson House, Fort Sinquefield, and the Grove Hill Courthouse Square Historic District.

Geography

Climate
According to the Köppen climate classification, Grove Hill has a humid subtropical climate (abbreviated Cfa).

Demographics

2020 census

As of the 2020 United States Census, there were 1,818 people, 669 households, and 467 families residing in the town.

2010 census
As of the census of 2010, there were 1,570 people, 615 households, and 402 families residing in the town. The racial makeup of the town was 56.6% White, 41.3% Black or African American, 0.3% Native American, 0.5% from other races, and 1.0% from two or more races. 2.0% of the population were Hispanic or Latino of any race.

There were 582 households, out of which 30.6% had children under the age of 18 living with them, 41.5% were married couples living together, 21.0% had a female householder with no husband present, and 34.6% were non-families. 31.9% of all households were made up of individuals, and 14.8% had someone living alone who was 65 years of age or older. The average household size was 2.36 and the average family size was 2.99.

In the town, the population was spread out, with 23.9% under the age of 18, 8.0% from 18 to 24, 26.0% from 25 to 44, 25.8% from 45 to 64, and 16.2% who were 65 years of age or older. The median age was 38.5 years. For every 100 females, there were 98.2 males. For every 100 females age 18 and over, there were 107.3 males.

Education
Public Education is provided by the Clarke County School System. Located in Grove Hill are Clarke County High School (grades 9 through 12), Wilson Hall Middle School (grades 5 through 8), and Grove Hill Elementary School (grades K though 4).

There is one private school in Grove Hill. Clarke Preparatory School provides education for grades K through 12.

Media

Radio station
WBMH 106.1 FM (Classic Country)

Notable people 
 Lemuel J. Alston, U.S. Representative from South Carolina who lived in Grove Hill from 1816 until his death in 1836
 Doug Barfield – Auburn University football coach
 Zechariah Bettis, politician who served as the Probate Judge of Clarke County, Alabama during the American Civil War
 John W. Cranford – Representative for Texas.
 Grant Gillis – Major League Baseball player
 Marc Keahey, Democratic member of the Alabama Senate, representing the 22nd district
 F. David Mathews – United States Secretary of Health, Education, and Welfare
 Cliff Nobles – Pop musician

References

External links

 The Town of Grove Hill and the Grove Hill Area Chamber of Commerce Web site

Towns in Clarke County, Alabama
Towns in Alabama
County seats in Alabama
Populated places established in 1832
1832 establishments in Alabama